The 1964 Richmond upon Thames Council election took place on 7 May 1964 to elect members of Richmond upon Thames London Borough Council in London, England. The whole council was up for election and the Conservative Party gained control of the council.

Background
These elections were the first to the newly formed borough. Previously elections had taken place in the Municipal Borough of Barnes, Municipal Borough of Richmond and Municipal Borough of Twickenham. These boroughs were joined to form the new London Borough of Richmond upon Thames by the London Government Act 1963.

A total of 154 candidates stood in the election for the 54 seats being contested across 25 wards. These included a full slate from the Conservative and Labour parties, while the Liberals stood 40 candidates. Other candidates included 3 Communists, 2 Independents and 1 Resident. There were 12 single-seat wards, 10 three-seat wards and 3 four-seat wards.

This election had aldermen as well as directly elected councillors.  The Conservatives got 7 aldermen and Labour 2.

The Council was elected in 1964 as a "shadow authority" but did not start operations until 1 April 1965.

Election result
The results saw the Conservatives gain the new council with a majority of 28 after winning 41 of the 54 seats. Overall turnout in the election was 47.5%. This turnout included 750 postal votes.

Results

Ward results

References

1964
Richmond upon Thames